Tummilla Lift Irrigation Project is a lift irrigation project located in Jogulamba Gadwal district, Telangana State in India. It is being built at a cost Rupees 783 crores. Phase I of the project is expected to be completed by June 2018. It comes under Rajolibanda Diversion Scheme. It is expected to irrigate 87,000 acres in 87,000 acres in Gadwal and Alampur.

References

Irrigation in Telangana